David Lloyd (or Lloyde) ( 1688 – 1747?) was a Welsh translator and cleric.

Lloyd was the son of Phillip Lloyde of St David's, Pembrokeshire, south Wales. He matriculated at Jesus College, Oxford, in December 1707 at the age of 19, obtaining his BA degree in 1712 and his MA degree in 1714. He was ordained deacon in 1711 and priest in 1712 by John Tyler, Bishop of Llandaff. In 1713 he was appointed to the parish of Llandefalle, Breconshire and in 1717 also to the parish of Cefnllys in Radnorshire. He held these positions until his death, which was before October 1747.

References

1680s births
1747 deaths
18th-century Welsh Anglican priests
Welsh translators
Alumni of Jesus College, Oxford
English–Welsh translators
18th-century British translators